Ninad Kadam (born 16 November 1992) is an Indian cricketer. He made his List A debut for Tripura in the 2018–19 Vijay Hazare Trophy on 3 October 2018. He made his first-class debut for Tripura in the 2018–19 Ranji Trophy on 1 November 2018. He made his Twenty20 debut for Tripura in the 2018–19 Syed Mushtaq Ali Trophy on 21 February 2019.

References

External links
 

1992 births
Living people
Indian cricketers
Tripura cricketers
Place of birth missing (living people)